Jean Landry Poulangoye Mayelet (born 9 September 1976) is a Gabonese former professional footballer who played as a midfielder.

Career
In December 2014, Poulangoye joined Belgian club R. Sprimont Comblain Sport from FC Martigues who were in financial difficulties. In summer 2005 he left Sprimont and joined French lower-league side FA Carcassonne Villalbe.

Poulangoye played for Indonesia Super League club Arema F.C. in the 2009–10 season and made 11 appearances. The club was sanctioned by FIFA for terminating his contract unilaterally.

In 2011, he played for another Indonesian side, Aceh United.

References

External links
 
 

Living people
1976 births
Association football forwards
Gabonese footballers
Gabon international footballers
Championnat National players
Championnat National 2 players
Swiss Super League players
Liga Portugal 2 players
Liga 1 (Indonesia) players
Petrosport F.C. players
FC Mulhouse players
AS Cherbourg Football players
Étoile Carouge FC players
Associação Naval 1º de Maio players
Tours FC players
SC Draguignan players
FC Martigues players
Red Star F.C. players
Pietà Hotspurs F.C. players
Arema F.C. players
Aceh United F.C. players
Indonesian Super League-winning players
Gabonese expatriate footballers
Expatriate footballers in France
Gabonese expatriate sportspeople in France
Expatriate footballers in Switzerland
Gabonese expatriate sportspeople in Switzerland
Expatriate footballers in Portugal
Gabonese expatriate sportspeople in Portugal
Expatriate footballers in Belgium
Gabonese expatriate sportspeople in Belgium
Expatriate footballers in Malta
Expatriate footballers in Indonesia
Gabonese expatriate sportspeople in Indonesia
21st-century Gabonese people